Sanski Most is a town and municipality located in the Una-Sana Canton of the Federation of Bosnia and Herzegovina, an entity of Bosnia and Herzegovina. It is situated on the banks of the Sana River in northwestern Bosnia and Herzegovina, in the region of Bosanska Krajina, between Prijedor and Ključ. As of 2013, it has a population of 41,475 inhabitants.

Geography
It is located on the Sana River in Bosanska Krajina, between Prijedor and Ključ. Administratively it is part of the Una-Sana Canton of the Federation of Bosnia and Herzegovina. The Town sits on Nine Rivers, the Nine Rivers are : Sana, Dabar, Zdena, Bliha, Majdanska Rijeka, Japra, Sasinka and Kozica

History
In 1878 the little town (varošica) of Sanski Most was described as Muslim by Croatian historian Vjekoslav Klaić. From 1929 to 1941, Sanski Most was part of the Vrbas Banovina of the Kingdom of Yugoslavia.

During World War II it was part of the Axis Independent State of Croatia (NDH), where the fascist Ustaše regime committed the Genocide of the Serbs and the Holocaust. At the beginning of May 1941 in several villages south-east of Sanski Most (Kijevo, Tramošnja, Kozica, etc.) the first armed conflict between the Ustaše and insurgent Serbs occurred. The event is known as the Đurđevdan uprising. In August 1941 on the Eastern Orthodox Elijah's holy day, who is the patron saint of Bosnia and Herzegovina, between 2,800 and 5,500 Serbs from Sanski Most and the surrounding area were killed and thrown into pits which have been dug by victims themselves. The State Anti-fascist Council for the National Liberation of Bosnia and Herzegovina (ZAVNOBiH) held its second meeting from 30 June to 2 July 1944 in the town; it declared the equality of Muslims (Bosniaks), Serbs and Croats.

During the Bosnian War, the town was controlled by the Army of Republika Srpska (Bosnian Serbs) and remained under its control until October 1995 when the Army of Bosnia and Herzegovina took over it during Operation Sana shortly before the end of the war. The Bosniaks and other Non Serbs were set to large ethnic cleansing during its control by the Army of Republika Srpska (VRS). Many Serbs from Sanski Most and Bosniaks from Prijedor exchanged homes due to their refugee status and the opposing federations.

In 1996, Serb-inhabited Oštra Luka was split from Sanski Most and ceded to the Republika Srpska entity.

Demographics

Population

Ethnic composition

Economy

There are several non-governmental organisations in Sanski Most. Center for Peacebuilding, in the local language "Centar za Izgradnju Mira (CIM)" has been active in the city since 2004. The "Fenix Center", Centar Fenix provides humanitarian aid to the persons in need in the local community. The organisation "Krajiška Suza" is providing care in medical, social, psychological, cultural and existential needs of people living in and around Sanski Most. Austrian manufacturer of exhaust pipes Remus has a manufacturing facility in Sanski Most that employs around 300 people. Sanski Most was selected as one of the most successful local communities within the UNDP project that was financed by Swiss embassy.

Sport
The football club of the town is NK Podgrmeč.

Notable people
 Mehmed Alagić, general
 Milan Vukić, chess grandmaster
 Anna Ibrisagic, Swedish politician
 Enver Redžić, historian
 Kemal Malovčić, singer
 Milenko Zorić, Serbian sprint canoer, silver medalist at the 2016 Summer Olympics, World and European champion
 Vukašin Brajić, singer
 Milka Milinković, Paralympic track and field athlete, Croatia's most successful Paralympian

Gallery

See also
 Una-Sana Canton
 Bosanska Krajina

References

Citations

Bibliography

External links

 Official site
 http://www.sanskimost.com/
 http://www.sanski-most.info
 https://web.archive.org/web/20090106174502/http://www.sanskaognjista.org/
 Center for Peacebuilding web presence 
 Krajiška Suza web presence